Velli is the sixth and last album released by Punjabi Bhangra artist Kulwinder Dhillon before his death in a car accident on March 19 of 2006. This album is also believed to be his most successful album which is believed to have sold over four hundred thousand copies worldwide.

Track listing
 Gaddi    
 Hikk De Jor    
 Meharbani    
 Pailli    
 Saal Solwan    
 Sup Ranga    
 Tera Pyar    
 Valli

2005 albums
Kulwinder Dhillon albums